Ulhas Gandhe (born 5 October 1974) is an Indian former first-class cricketer. He is now an umpire and has stood in matches in the 2015–16 Ranji Trophy.

References

External links
 

1974 births
Living people
Indian cricketers
Indian cricket umpires
Vidarbha cricketers
Cricketers from Nagpur